Don't Cry Wolf was the second album by American hard rock band London, released in 1986.

The song "For Whom the Bell Tolls" was co-written by Blackie Lawless, he later recorded his own version with W.A.S.P., featured on the album The Headless Children.

"Oh! Darling" is a cover of The Beatles song.

The album was remastered and reissued in 2014.

Track listing 
 "Drop the Bomb"
 "Set Me Free"
 "Hit and Run Lover"
 "Under the Gun"
 "Oh! Darling"
 "Fast as Light"
 "Put Out the Fire"
 "Killing Time"
 "We Want Everything"
 "For Whom the Bell Tolls"

Band members
Nadir D'Priest - vocals
Lizzie Grey - guitar
Brian West - bass
Wailin' J. Morgan - drums

Additional Musicians
David Carr - keyboards

References

1986 albums
London (heavy metal band) albums